Jesús Iván Rodríguez Trujillo (born 21 May 1993), also known as La Araña, is a Mexican professional footballer who plays as a goalkeeper for Liga MX club Puebla.

References

1993 births
Living people
Liga MX players
Association football goalkeepers
Club Puebla players
Footballers from Chiapas
Mexican footballers